APSAC may refer to:

 The American Professional Society on the Abuse of Children (apsac.org)
 The Army Public School and College (Pakistan)
 Anisoylated plasminogen streptokinase activator complex (anistreplase)